Calçado River may refer to:

Brazil
 Calçado River (Itabapoana River tributary), in Espírito Santo
 Calçado River (Jacarandá River tributary), in Espírito Santo
 Calçado River (Rio de Janeiro), a tributary of the Paraíba do Sul